George Bennett (1888 - February 29, 1948) was the 19th Mayor of the City of Windsor and a Member of Provincial Parliament in Legislative Assembly of Ontario from 1943 to 1945. He represented the riding of Windsor—Sandwich for the Co-operative Commonwealth Federation (CCF).

Bennett's time as a mayor was brief, from 1935 to 1936. He was preceded by David Croll and succeeded by Ernest S. Wigle.

Bennett was elected in a surprise sweep by the CCF and Ted Jolliffe in 1943, where his party went from no seats to 34. He served on several Legislative Committees including Public Accounts, Municipal Law, and Game and Fish. He lost his seat in 1945, along with many of his fellow CCF MPP's. Windsor-Sandwich would not be represented by a social democrat until 1967 when Hugh Peacock was elected.

In 1910 he married Hannah Elizabeth Hackney. He died in Windsor, Ontario at the age of 60.

References

External links

1888 births
1948 deaths
20th-century Canadian legislators
Mayors of Windsor, Ontario
Ontario Co-operative Commonwealth Federation MPPs